"Pa' Que la Pases Bien" is a single by American reggaeton artist Arcángel from his first compilation album El Fenomeno, released in February 2008.

When the album was almost completed, some of the tracks from the album were leaked onto the Internet. It was at that point that Arcángel decided to distribute the album free of charge, via download. The single is also available to download for free.

Although the single was distributed for free, the song was able to peak at number 32 on the Billboard Latin Rhythm Airplay chart, because of heavy radio play.

Charts

References

2008 singles
Arcángel (singer) songs
Spanish-language songs
2007 songs
Universal Music Group singles